Savadatti  is one of the oldest towns in Belagavi district in the Indian state of Karnataka. It is a celebrated pilgrimage centre located 78 kilometres from Belagavi and 41 kilometres from Dharwad. Savadatti is also the name of the taluk (sub-district), which was previously named Parasgad. There are several ancient temples in Savadatti.

History of  Rashtrakuta kings

The historical name of the Savadatti was Sugandavarti "Sougandipura". It was the capital of the Ratta dynasty (from 875-1230), until the capital shifted to Belagavi.

 During the twelfth and thirteenth centuries, Belagavi was the capital of the Rattas, the chieftains of Savadatti. The fort at Belagavi was built by Bichiraja (Ratta Dynasty) in 1204.
 The Ratta clan was one of several names of the Rashtrakuta Dynasty.
 Rattas of Savadatti accepted the overlordship of Taila II (AD 973-977).
 Two of the pillars at Belagavi fort have Kannada inscriptions in Nagari script, one inscription from around 1199 is attributed to the Ratta king Kartaveerya IV.

Rattas (Rashtrakutas)

 In one of the inscriptions related to Rattas of Savadatti it is mentioned that Krishna III having appointed Prithvirama as a chief feudatory had dignified the Ratta dynasty of Savadatti.

 The Rattas of Savadatti, used to represent themselves as Lords of Lattaluru(present day Latur).

Inscriptions

 At Savadatti, Jain inscription slab written in Sanskrit and Kanarese (Kannada) of Krishna Rashtrakuta, Shaka 797 (c. 875 AD), and Vikramaditya, Shaka 1017 (c. 1095 AD).

 At Savadatti, in front of the Western Chalukya-style Ankeshwara temple, there is an inscription carved into the wall by the Ratta Chief Ankarasa.

Jainism
 The Rattas of Savadatti are Jains by religion.
 In the 11th century  Rattas of Savadatti and their provincial governors were great patrons of Jainism. Kartivirya's son, a Jain saint Munichandra, a minister to Laksmideva and a teacher, and has the title of Acarya, the founder of Ratta-rajya.
 Savadatti has two small Jain basadis dating back to Ratta times.

Tourism

Savadatti fort
18th century Savadatti fort was built by the Sirasangi Desai with 8 bastions.
Savadatti fort has a Kadasiddheshwara temple, surrounded by four bastions. Around the Kadasiddheshwara temple in the inner chajja of the prakara there is a row of carvings of geometrical patterns with over two hundred designs, some painted.

Renuka Saagara 

Renuka Saagara is a reservoir by the Malaprabha River adjacent to Savadatti, formed by the Naviluteertha Dam. The name Renuka Saagara is because of the Renuka (Yellamma) temple at Yellammagudda, Savadatti.

Savadatti Yallammana 

The temple of the goddess Yellamma or Shree Renukadevi, is a pilgrimage site for Shakti devotees. Every day, hundreds of pilgrims visit the temple. The congregation is especially large, crossing the one million mark, on two auspicious days in the year - Banada Hunnime and Bharatha Hunnime. The century-old temple of Yellamma is situated atop Yellammanagudda, amidst the picturesque Ramalinga Hills, about 5kmsfrom Savadatti. Between Savadatti and the temple is the magnificent fort of Paarusgad, dating back to the 10th century.

Naviluteertha 

The Renuka Sagara, formed by the Naviluteertha Dam, touches the low-lying areas of Savadatti. There is a spot called Jogullabhaavi here, where there is a temple. Pilgrims take a holy dip here before visiting the Yellamma hill. This Samaadhi (grave) is in the Ramapura area of Savadatti.

Shirasangi Shri KalikaDevi Temple
Shirasangi a small village located approximately 25 kilometers from Savadati is famous for Shri Kalikadevi temple. The temple is known to be very ancient and is believed to be the place where Shringa maharishi worshiped Shri Kalikadevi. Shirasangi is also known for Shri Tyagveera Lingaraja Desai. Shri Lingaraj was one of the main donors to give land to K.L.E Society.

Savadatti Temples

The town has temples dedicated to Ankeshwara, Puradeshwara, Nagarkere Mallikarjuna, Veerabhadra, Ulvi Basavaeshwara, Mouneshwara, Dyamavva and Venkateshwara, which is the largest.

Puradeshwara temple
The Puradeshwara temple in the later Chalukya style is a trikutachala with three ardhamantapas, a common navaranga and two mukhamantapas. Gurlhosur Chidambar temple is also an historical temple. All three garbhagrihas with pierced windows have shivalingas. The shikhara, now damaged, over the central garbhagriha is in Kadambanagara style and the navaranga pillars are lathe-turned. Inside the niches of the navaranga are images of Parvati and Veerabhadra. This temple has been renovated very crudely. On the day of Ugadi, the rising sun's rays fall directly on the main shivalinga. The outer walls have fine sculptures depicting Hindu mythology and there are inclined chajjas all round. The open mukhamantapa, a later addition, is also in the same style with massive pillars.

Ankeshwara temple
The Ankeshwara temple in Desaigalli, built by Rattas in 1048 is in the Western Chalukya style and is below the ground level. There are steps descending to the mukhamantapa. 
In front of the temple, there is an inscription carved into the wall by the builder, Ratta Chief Ankarasa.

Gallery

See also

References

On can get more info, from the http://karnatakatravel.blogspot.com/ (which I do often).

Culture of Karnataka
Hindu temples in Belagavi district
Tourism in Karnataka
History of Karnataka
Forts in Belagavi district
Former capital cities in India